Thomas Harry Rose (1870 – 17 October 1946) was an English professional footballer who played as a winger.

References

1870 births
1946 deaths
People from Waveney District
English footballers
Association football wingers
Grimsby Town F.C. players
Grimsby All Saints F.C. players
English Football League players